The 1898 Washington & Jefferson football team was an American football team that represented Washington & Jefferson College as an independent during the 1898 college football season.  Led by William D. Inglis in his first and only year as head coach, the team compiled a record of 9–2.

Schedule

References

Washington and Jefferson
Washington & Jefferson Presidents football seasons
Washington and Jefferson football